Gurling Glacier is a glacier draining between Krebs Ridge and Leininger Peak into the southwest corner of Smith Inlet, on the east coast of Palmer Land, Antarctica. It was named by the UK Antarctic Place-Names Committee after Paul William Gurling, a British Antarctic Survey surveyor who worked in the general vicinity of this feature.
Paul (b. 1946) was a BAS surveyor, Stonington Island.

References

Glaciers of Palmer Land